Coast to Coast Motel is the second album by G. Love & Special Sauce, released in 1995.

Critical reception

The Dallas Observer called Coast to Coast Motel "almost completely stripped of the hip-hop that so pleasantly tempered the straightforward blues of the first album." Trouser Press wrote that the group "establishes an easy mastery of understated rhythm and harmonic economy." SF Weekly called it "steeped in the feel-good blues vibe of the G. Love live experience."

Track listing
All songs by G. Love, except as noted

"Sweet Sugar Mama" (G. Love, J. Clemens, J. Prescott) – 4:05
"Leaving the City" – 3:40
"Nancy" (G. Love, J. Clemens, J. Prescott) – 3:21
"Kiss and Tell" – 3:14
"Chains #3" (G. Love, J. Clemens, J. Prescott) – 2:58
"Sometimes" – 4:23
"Everybody" – 3:40
"Soda Pop" (G. Love, J. Clemens) – 3:49
"Bye Bye Baby" – 4:39
"Tomorrow Night" – 4:55
"Small Fish" (G. Love, J. Clemens, J. Prescott) – 5:21
"Coming Home" – 4:35

Personnel 
G. Love – guitar, harmonica, vocals
Jeffrey "Thunderhouse" Clemens – drums, backing vocals
Jimi "Jazz" Prescott – double bass
Rebirth Brass Band – horns
Jim Dickinson – electric piano, producer
BroDeeva – backing vocals
Technical
Chika Azuma – Art Direction, Design
Richard Hasal – Assistant Engineer
Keith Keller – Producer, Mixing
Ron Kruit – Photography
Bob Krusen – Engineer
Stephen Marcussen – Mastering
Trina Shoemaker – Assistant Engineer
Don Smith – Mixing
Special Sauce – Producer
Ski Williams – Illustrations

Coast to Coast Motel is also an actual motel in Hinton, West Virginia, where the New and Greenbrier Rivers meet.

References

External links
G. Love & Special Sauce Official site

G. Love & Special Sauce albums
1995 albums
albums produced by Jim Dickinson
Epic Records albums